Chelidonic acid is a heterocyclic organic acid with a pyran skeleton.

Preparation
Chelidonic acid can be prepared in two steps from diethyl oxalate and acetone:

Uses
Chelidonic acid is used to synthesize 4-pyrone via thermal decarboxylation.

Natural occurrence
Chelidonic acid was first discovered in extracts of Chelidonium majus.  It occurs naturally in plants of the Asparagales order.  Potassium chelidonate has been found to be responsible for nyctinasty in some plants; specifically, it has been found to regulate the closing of leaves of Cassia mimosoides at nightfall.

See also
 Dimethyl oxalate
 Dehydroacetic acid

References

4-Pyrones
Dicarboxylic acids